The Bridge of Oich (also known as Victoria Bridge, Aberchalder) is a taper principle suspension bridge, designed by James Dredge, across the River Oich near Aberchalder in Highland, Scotland. The bridge opened in 1854 and was used to take the main road traffic over the river until 1932.

Overview 
The bridge was designed by James Dredge, an engineer from England. Dredge used his patented 'taper principle' design for the bridge. The bridge uses a double cantilever system where two opposing cantilevers are supported by suspension chains giving it the appearance of a classic suspension bridge. The chains consist of twelve parallel rods at the tower and progressively reduce in width by one link at each joint towards each end of the chains as they get further from the towers. The decking is of timber, supported on trussed wrought-iron transoms.

History 
In 1849 an old stone bridge that spanned the River Oich near Aberchalder was destroyed by flooding. To reduce the risk of a new bridge being damaged by similar flooding, it was decided that a single-span bridge was required to replace the old bridge. English engineer James Dredge was engaged to provide such a bridge. Dredge used his patented 'taper principle' for the bridge which was opened in 1854. Dredge's bridge carried the main road traffic across the River Oich until the construction of a two-lane concrete bridge in 1932. Following its withdrawal from service, the bridge fell into disrepair and had to be closed to public use. The bridge, which is now a listed building, was renovated for Historic Scotland in 1997, and returned to use as a public footbridge.

Images

See also

References

External links

Bridges in Highland (council area)
Bridges by James Dredge
Listed bridges in Scotland
Bridges completed in 1854
1854 establishments in Scotland